Italy debuted at the Junior Eurovision Song Contest when the twelfth edition of competition was held in Malta in 2014. The Italian broadcaster, RAI, selected the debut entry of country via an internal selection as "Tu primo grande amore" by Vincenzo Cantiello, which went on to win with a total of 159 points. This made Italy the second country to win with the debut entry after Croatia's victory in the first edition. Before Italy debuted, there were two entries sung in Italian: "Birichino", which represented Switzerland in 2004 and "O-o-o Sole intorno a me" which represented San Marino in 2013.

In 2015, the Italian broadcaster decided to participate again, this time sending the twins Chiara and Martina Scarpari to the contest. However, Italy only finished 16th in the contest, collecting 34 points. The next year, Italy achieved its second podium finishing third.

Italy withdrew from the 2020 contest because of the COVID-19 pandemic, and despite initially announcing that they will not return to the 2021 contest, they ultimately announced that they would return to the 2021 contest in France, where their entrant Elisabetta Lizza placed 10th with 107 points.

Participation overview

Commentators and spokespersons

The contests are broadcast online worldwide through the official Junior Eurovision Song Contest website junioreurovision.tv and YouTube. In 2015, the online broadcasts featured commentary in English by junioreurovision.tv editor Luke Fisher and 2011 Bulgarian Junior Eurovision Song Contest entrant Ivan Ivanov. The Italian broadcaster, RAI, sent their own commentators to each contest in order to provide commentary in the Italian language. Spokespersons were also chosen by the national broadcaster in order to announce the awarding points from Italy. The table below list the details of each commentator and spokesperson since 2014.

Photo gallery

See also
 Italy in the Eurovision Song Contest – Senior version of the Junior Eurovision Song Contest.
 Italy in the Eurovision Young Dancers – A competition organised by the EBU for younger dancers aged between 16 and 21.
 Italy in the Eurovision Young Musicians – A competition organised by the EBU for musicians aged 18 years and younger.

Notes

References

Countries in the Junior Eurovision Song Contest